The common litter skink (Caledoniscincus austrocaledonicus) is a species of lizard in the family Scincidae. It is endemic to New Caledonia.

References

Caledoniscincus
Skinks of New Caledonia
Endemic fauna of New Caledonia
Reptiles described in 1869
Taxa named by Arthur René Jean Baptiste Bavay